Ballycommon is a parish and village in County Offaly, Ireland. It is located 10 km east of Tullamore.

Sport
Ballycommon GAA club is located within the village. Ballycommon won the Junior football championship in Offaly in 2017 and are still on the beer.

Ballycommon Civil Parish
Ballycommon civil parish comprises 11 townlands: Ballycommon, Ballyteige Big, Ballyteige Little, Bracklin Big, Bracklin Little, Derrygrogan Big, Derrygrogan Little, Fairfield, Kilmurry, Rathdrum and Wood Of O.

Radio Mast
The RTÉ MW transmitter mast at Ballycommon began construction in 1973. It ceased operation on 24 March 2008 however the mast still remains in place for future use.

References

Civil parishes of County Offaly